Mary Smith Lockwood (1831–1922) was one of the founders of the Daughters of the American Revolution.

Biography 
On July 13, 1890, after the Sons of the American Revolution refused to allow women to join their group, Lockwood published the story of patriot Hannah White Arnett in The Washington Post, ending her piece with the question, "Where will the Sons and Daughters of the American Revolution place Hannah Arnett?" On July 21 of that year, William O. McDowell, a great-grandson of Hannah White Arnett, published an article in The Washington Post offering to help form a society to be known as the Daughters of the American Revolution. The first meeting of the society was held August 9, 1890.

The Daughters of the American Revolution was officially founded on October 11, 1890, at 2 p.m. at the Strathmore Arms, the home of Lockwood, who was one of its four co-founders. Sons of the American Revolution members Registrar General Dr. George Brown Goode, Secretary General A. Howard Clark, William O. McDowell (SAR member #1), Wilson L. Gill (secretary at the inaugural meeting), and 18 other people met at the Strathmore Arms that day, but Lockwood, Eugenia Washington, Mary Desha, and Ellen Hardin Walworth are called co-founders since they held two to three meetings in August 1890.

Lockwood was also the Daughters of the American Revolution's first historian, and served as editor of the Daughters of the American Revolution Magazine from 1894 to 1900. The Daughters of the American Revolution was inspired by her to resolve on October 18, 1890, to "provide a place for the collection of Historical relics which will accumulate…and for historical portraits, pictures, etc.  This may first be in rooms, and later in the erection of a fire-proof building."

Lockwood was a friend and advisor to women's rights activists Susan B. Anthony and Elizabeth Cady Stanton, and wrote in newspapers about women's rights.

She wrote many books, the most notable being Historic Homes of Washington and Hand Book of Ceramic Art.

She also promoted women's clubs and was the founder of the Travel Club and president of the Woman's National Press Association, as well as Lady Manager at Large at the World's Columbian Exposition in Chicago in 1893.
 
Lockwood died in 1922, and was the last surviving founder of the Daughters of the American Revolution, as well as the only founder buried in Washington.

Her work in founding the Daughters of the American Revolution is mentioned in Women and Patriotism in Jim Crow America (2005), by Francesca Morgan.

Legacy 
On April 17, 1929, under the leadership of President General Grace L. H. Brosseau,  the Daughters of the American Revolution dedicated a memorial to its four founders, including Lockwood. The memorial was sculpted by Gertrude Vanderbilt Whitney, who was a member of the Daughters of the American Revolution, and is located at Constitution Hall in Washington, D.C.

A memorial to Lockwood was dedicated in 1940 at the four corners in Smith Mills, New York, consisting of a large native boulder with a bronze tablet inset, stating, "Birthplace of Mary Smith Lockwood 1831-1922, Pen Founder of the National Society of the Daughters of the American Revolution. Erected by Benjamin Prescott, Ellicott, Jamestown, Major Benjamin Bosworth and Patterson Chapters, 1940." (However, according to the Daughters of the American Revolution, Lockwood was actually born in Hanover, New York.)

The Mary Smith Lockwood Founders Medal for Education is awarded by the Daughters of the American Revolution.

References

Works cited

External links
 
“Mary Smith Lockwood: Famous Woman of Hanover” by Marion Thomas, published May 28, 1964

1831 births
1922 deaths
American essayists
Founders of lineage societies
Daughters of the American Revolution people
American women essayists